The Civil Center for National Initiative is a Lebanese think-tank which aims to promote the role of civil society in Lebanese politics, as well as establish a civil and non-confessional state in Lebanon.

Created in 2008, its founding members include statesman Hussein el-Husseini, journalist Ghassan Tueni, poet Adunis, among others,  which include members of parliament, university professors and journalists.

In 2009, following a long campaign, the Center succeeded in persuading the Lebanese Ministry of Interior to allow citizens to remove sectarian affiliation from civil records, a landmark in Lebanese history.

See also 
 Secularism in Lebanon

References

2008 establishments in Lebanon
Think tanks established in 2008
Think tanks based in Lebanon
Civil liberties advocacy groups
Election and voting-related organizations
Secularism in Lebanon